Zile is a city and a district of Tokat Province.

Zile may also refer to:

 Zile Ram Chochra, Indian politician
 Zil-e-Huma (1945–2014), Pakistani pop singer

See also
 Van Zile, a surname (including a list of people with the name)